George Thomas Russell (7 July 1893, in Chatham, Kent – ?) was an English football player of the 1920s who played professionally for Gillingham. He made three Football League appearances.

References

1893 births
Date of death missing
Sportspeople from Chatham, Kent
English footballers
Gillingham F.C. players
Association football forwards